Miroslav Strejček (16 January 1929 – 19 March 2000) is a Czechoslovak rower. He competed at the 1960 Summer Olympics in Rome with the men's coxed pair where they were eliminated in the round one repêchage. He died in 2000.

References

1929 births
2000 deaths
People from Mladá Boleslav District
Czechoslovak male rowers
Olympic rowers of Czechoslovakia
Rowers at the 1960 Summer Olympics
European Rowing Championships medalists
Sportspeople from the Central Bohemian Region